Cyrtodiopsis is a genus of stalk-eyed flies in the family Diopsidae.

Species
Cyrtodiopsis africana Shillito, 1940 (Uganda, Congo)
Cyrtodiopsis concava Yang & Chen, 1998 (Yunnan)
Cyrtodiopsis currani Shillito, 1940 (Thailand)
Cyrtodiopsis dalmanni (Wiedemann, 1830) (Malaysia)
Cyrtodiopsis plauta Yang & Chen, 1998 (Yunnan)

References

Diopsidae
Diopsoidea genera
Diptera of Africa
Diptera of Asia